ALGOL X was the code name given to a programming language which was being developed as a successor to ALGOL 60, by the International Federation for Information Processing (IFIP) IFIP Working Group 2.1 on Algorithmic Languages and Calculi, which supports and maintains the languages ALGOL 60 and ALGOL 68. It attempted to find a "short-term solution to existing difficulties". ALGOL N and ALGOL W were two other ALGOL versions proposed to fulfill this need.

According to de Morgan, "... the Algol 60 devotees had not been idle... they set out to eliminate the dreaded Remaining Trouble Spots. They called their Algol 60 'Modified'."

One ALGOL X compiler is known to have existed. It was written with the Automated Engineering Design (AED-0) system, also termed ALGOL Extended for Design, by Douglas T. Ross of the Massachusetts Institute of Technology (MIT).

Example class definition: (an extract from AB26.2.2)
 class expression is constant (real value) ora variable (string printname)
    ora class pair is (sum ora difference ora product 
        ora quotient)((expression) left operand, right operand, derivative);
Example class usage:
  (expression) X; (constant) Y; (pair) Z; (product) Q;
 
  X := Y:= constant(10.5);
  Z := Q := product(variable("ALPHA"), constant(2.), constant(2.))

"Initially the proposal for an update to Algol was Algol X, with Algol Y being the name reserved for
the corresponding metalanguage. Van Wijngaarden produced a paper for the 1963 IFIP programming language
committee, entitled “Generalized Algol,” which contained the basic concepts which were eventually
incorporated into Algol 68."

The ALGOL Bulletin on ALGOL X 
 AB21.3.1 – G. Seegmuller: Some proposals for ALGOL X
 AB21.3.2 – Joachim von Peschke: Proposals for ALGOL X
 AB22.3.2 – J.N. Merner: Own concept and ALGOL X
 AB22.3.10 – M. Woodger: ALGOL X, Note on the proposed successor to ALGOL 60
 AB25.0.1 – ALGOL Bulletin – ALGOL X
 AB26.2.2 – Douglas T. Ross: Features essential for a workable ALGOL X

References

External links
 Investigations in CAD FR035 Chapter IV- AED beyond Algol 60
 ALGOL X and ALGOL Y; Lambert Meertens; CWI Lectures in honour of Adriaan van Wijngaarden; November 2016

ALGOL 60 dialect